A major north–south highway extending almost the entire length of the Florida peninsula,  State Road 45 (SR 45) is the unsigned Florida Department of Transportation designation of most of the current U.S. Route 41 in Florida.  The southern terminus of SR 45 is an intersection with SR 90 in downtown Naples; the northern terminus is an intersection with US 441 (SR 25) in High Springs.  South of Causeway Boulevard (SR 676) near Tampa, SR 45 is also known as the Tamiami Trail.

South and east of Naples, US 41 turns eastward as SR 90 as the Tamiami Trail crosses the Everglades on its way to Miami; north of High Springs, US 41 overlaps US 441 (SR 25) until their split in Lake City (from there US 41 continues to the Georgia border with the hidden SR 25 designation).

Separations of US 41 and SR 45 between SR 45 termini

SR 45 away from US 41
Business US 41 - Venice
Business US 41 - Bradenton to Memphis
Business US 41 (historic US 541) - Rockport to Ybor City
SR 60 - Tampa to Ybor City
SR 45 (not overlapped between Adamo Drive/SR 60 and Hillsborough Avenue/US 41-92-SR 600) - Tampa

US 41 away from SR 45
SR 45A - Venice
US 301 - Bradenton, concurrent with SR 55
SR 55 - Bradenton to Memphis
SR 599 - Rockport to Tampa
US 92(SR 600) - Tampa

Additional concurrencies with SR 45
SR 45-55 - Memphis
US 41/SR 45-60 - Ybor City
US 41/SR 45-700 - Brooksville
US 41/SR 44-45 - Inverness
Alt US 27-US 41/SR 45-500 - Williston
US 27-US 41/SR 45 - Williston to High Springs

Major intersections

State Road 45A

State Road 45A (SR 45A) is the Venice Bypass, a segment along U.S. Route 41 (US 41) east of the Tamiami Trail in Venice, which was originally part of US 41 until 1965 when that segment was redesignated as US 41 Bus after the Intracoastal Waterway (ICW) was dredged through Venice by the U.S. Army Corps of Engineers in 1964. The route begins near Shamrock Boulevard in Venice Gardens and terminates at Venetia Bay Boulevard in the Eastgate section of Venice.

References

External links
Florida Route Log (SR 45)

045
045
045
045
045
045
045
045
045
045
045
045
045
045
U.S. Route 41